This is a list of mayors of Lynn, Massachusetts, USA.

The area known today as the city of Lynn was originally part of a larger area named Saugus (part of which lives on as the Town of Saugus). It was renamed "Lynn" in 1637 in honor of King's Lynn in England. Lynn was incorporated as a city in 1850.

List

See also
 Timeline of Lynn, Massachusetts

Notes

References

Further reading
 

Lynn